Erle Palmer Halliburton was an American businessman specializing in oil field services.

Early life
Halliburton was born on September 22, 1892, near Henning, Tennessee, the son of Lou Emma (Cothran) and Edwin Graves Halliburton. When Halliburton was 12 years old, his father died. At 14, Halliburton left home to support the family. As a youth, he learned how to operate heavy machinery such as a locomotive, a steam crane, and a steam shovel. Later, Halliburton was a salesman in New York.

Business career
Before the United States entered into World War I, Halliburton gained exposure to shipboard engineering as a member of the United States Navy. After his honorable discharge in 1915, he headed for the oilfields of California, where he was able to apply techniques analogous to the technology with which he had worked in the Navy. His drive and his sense of innovation soon brought him into conflict with his boss, Almond Perkins. Halliburton later quipped that getting hired and getting fired by the Perkins Oil Well Cementing Company were the two best opportunities he had ever received.

Halliburton then moved to Duncan, Oklahoma where he invented, perfected, and patented a new method of oil well cementing. According to one of the inscriptions on the pictured monument, Halliburton's method "isolates the various downhole zones, guards against a collapse of the casing and permits control of the well during its producing life." In 1919, based on this new method, Halliburton started Duncan's New Method Oil Well Cementing Company. By 1922, the company was operating as the Halliburton Oil Well Cementing Company. On July 5, 1961, it became known as the Halliburton Company.

Halliburton also founded Southwest Air Fast Express, which was later acquired by American Airlines.

Halliburton designed the aluminum suitcases which are now manufactured by Zero Halliburton.

Halliburton was inducted into the Oklahoma Hall of Fame in 1957.

Halliburton died on October 13, 1957, in Los Angeles at the age of 65.

Private life 
Halliburton was married to Vida C. Taber Halliburton. They had 5 children: Erle P., Jr., David, Zola Catherine, Vida Jessie, and Ruth Lou.
Erle Halliburton was a cousin of the famed adventure writer Richard Halliburton.

Further reading
 Kenny A. Franks, The Oklahoma Petroleum Industry (Norman: University of Oklahoma Press, 1980);
 Kenny A. Franks, Paul F. Lambert, and Carl N. Tyson, Early Oklahoma Oil: A Photographic History, 1859–1936 (College Station: Texas A&M University Press, 1981).
 J. Evetts Haley, Erle P. Halliburton: Genius with Cement (Duncan, Okla.: Privately printed, 1959).

Notes

External links 

 Yearbook portrait of Erle Halliburton, Los Angeles, 1935. Los Angeles TimesPhotographic Archive (Collection 1429). UCLA Library Special Collections, Charles E. Young Research Library, University of California, Los Angeles. 

1892 births
1957 deaths
 People from Duncan, Oklahoma
 American businesspeople in the oil industry
Halliburton people
 American company founders
 People from Henning, Tennessee
 United States Navy sailors
20th-century American inventors